LIC Narasimhan was an Indian character actor who appeared in Tamil-language films. 

He has appeared in over 300 films and was also seen on the small screen and in ads.
He was working for LIC as an officer, quit his job to take up a career in Kollywood, hence was called as LIC Narasimhan. He had acted in many films in the role of doctor, police officer and Judge. 

He was seen as Superstar Rajinikanth’s brother in the hit film Aarilirunthu Arubathu Varai. His comical pronunciation of ‘Ninnu Kori Varnam’ and ‘Paal Irukke Palam Irukkee’ to ace comedian Goundamani in the film Themmangu Paattukaaran was very popular among the audience.

Partial filmography

Death
He died on 27 October 2011 of cancer. The actor suffered with cancer for two years and died while he was asleep. He is survived by a son and a daughter. His cremation took place at his residence in Valasaravakkam, Chennai.

References

Male actors in Tamil cinema
Indian male film actors
1940 births
2011 deaths
Date of birth missing
Place of birth missing